In mathematics, there are several theorems of Helmut Hasse that are sometimes called Hasse's theorem:

 Hasse norm theorem
 Hasse's theorem on elliptic curves
 Hasse–Arf theorem
 Hasse–Minkowski theorem

See also 

 Hasse principle, the principle that an integer equation can be solved by piecing together modular solutions